Robertas Antinis  (born 9 June 1946 in Kaunas) is a Lithuanian Sculptor, performance artist and poet.
He is a winner of the National Culture and Art Prize.

Life
He graduated from the Applied Arts School in Riga in 1965, and the Latvian State Art Academy in 1970.
He worked as a teacher at Kaunas children's art school in 1973–75.
From 1997, he was a lecturer of Vilnius Art Academy, and was a docent at the Kaunas Art Institute.
He has been a member of the Lithuanian Artists’ Union since 1974.
He started participating in exhibitions from 1969.
He is a member of Post Ars group.

Picture-shows 
1971  Dailininkų sąjungos Kauno skyrius, Kaunas, Lithuania.
1987  Kauno paveikslų galerija, Kaunas, Lithuania.
1989  Lietuvos dailės muziejus, Vilnius, Lithuania.
2000  Lietuvos ambasada, Riga, Latvia.
2002  Lietuvos dailininkų sąjungos parodų salė, Vilnius, Lithuania.

See also
List of Lithuanian painters

References

This article was initially translated from the Lithuanian Wikipedia.

1946 births
Living people
Artists from Kaunas
Lithuanian painters
Recipients of the Lithuanian National Prize